Scott Mann is a British film director originally from Newton Aycliffe, County Durham and now living in Los Angeles.

Career
Before making feature films Mann directed several award-winning short films including Chaingangs (2003) and Tug of War (2006), which starred Julie Goodyear, Marsha Thomason, Scott Neal and Jo Guest.

Mann has also directed several programmes for Granada Television.

His first feature film, The Tournament, an action movie released on 20 October 2009, produced by Keith Bell and written by Gary Young, Jonathan Frank, and Nick Rowntree stars Robert Carlyle, Ving Rhames, Kelly Hu, Ian Somerhalder and Scott Adkins. Mann's second feature film, Heist, originally Bus 657, was released on 13 November 2015, starring Robert De Niro, Kate Bosworth, Jeffrey Dean Morgan, and Dave Bautista.

Filmography
Short films

Feature films

Television

References

External links

 www.killerfilm.com Interview: Scott Mann on The Tournament

British film directors
Living people
Year of birth missing (living people)